1567 Alikoski, provisional designation , is a rare-type carbonaceous asteroid from the outer region of the asteroid belt, approximately 67 kilometers in diameter. It was discovered on 22 April 1941, by Finnish astronomer Yrjö Väisälä at Turku Observatory in Southwest Finland. It was later named after Finnish astronomer Heikki Alikoski.

Classification and orbit 

This asteroid orbits the Sun in the outer main-belt at a distance of 2.9–3.5 AU once every 5 years and 9 months (2,101 days). Its orbit has an eccentricity of 0.08 and an inclination of 17° with respect to the ecliptic. Alikoskis observation arc begins with a precovery taken at Turku in 1938, extending it by 3 years prior to the asteroid's official discovery observation.

Physical characteristics

Spectral type 

Alikoski is characterized as both a carbonaceous C-type asteroid and as a rare PU-type in the SMASS and Tholen taxonomic scheme, respectively.

Rotation period 

In March 2004, a rotational lightcurve of Alikoski was obtained by American amateur astronomer Robert Stephens at Santana Observatory in California. Lightcurve analysis gave a well-defined rotation period of 16.405 hours with a brightness variation of 0.16 magnitude.

Diameter and albedo 

According to the space-based surveys carried out by the Infrared Astronomical Satellite IRAS, the Japanese Akari satellite, and NASA's Wide-field Infrared Survey Explorer with its subsequent NEOWISE mission, Alikoski measures between 62.36 and 77.10 kilometers in diameter, and its surface has a low albedo between 0.04 and 0.062. The Collaborative Asteroid Lightcurve Link adopts the results obtained by IRAS, that is, an albedo of 0.0626 and a diameter of 67.83 kilometers based on an absolute magnitude of 9.47.

Naming 

This minor planet was named in honor of Finnish astronomer Heikki Alikoski (1912–1997), assistant to the discoverer from 1937 to 1956, and an observer and discoverer of minor planets himself. He also helped greatly in establishing the Turku Astronomical-Optical Institute. The official  was published by the Minor Planet Center on 20 February 1976.

References

External links 
 Asteroid Lightcurve Database (LCDB), query form (info )
 Dictionary of Minor Planet Names, Google books
 Asteroids and comets rotation curves, CdR – Observatoire de Genève, Raoul Behrend
 Discovery Circumstances: Numbered Minor Planets (1)-(5000) – Minor Planet Center
 
 

001567
Discoveries by Yrjö Väisälä
Named minor planets
001567
001567
19410422